Film Risky is the first music video compilation by Japanese rock duo B'z. To date, it is also the only music video collection released by the band, as well as their only video offering not available on DVD.

The majority of the album's videos were shot in New York City, while "Guitar Kids Rhapsody" was shot in the Camden Lock borough in London, and in its historic market. "Bad Communication" and "Itoshi Hito Yo...Goodnight" feature footage compiled from their tours.

Track listing 
Bad Communication -E.Style-
Risky

Gimme Your Love - Fukutsu no Love Driver - (Gimme Your Love - 不屈の Love Driver) 
Easy Come, Easy Go! -Risky Style-
Vampire Woman
Guitar Kids Rhapsody Camdem Lock Style
Itoshii Hitoyo Good Night... (愛しい人よGood Night...)

External links 
B'z Official Website 

B'z video albums
1990 video albums
1990 compilation albums
Music video compilation albums